Cropduster was an American alternative rock band from New Jersey.

History 
Cropduster was a four-piece alternative rock band from Hoboken, New Jersey. The name is derived from John Steinbeck's novel The Grapes of Wrath. They began playing live shows in North Jersey in the early 1990s, and released their debut self-titled album Cropduster in 1998. They achieved national recognition with their second album, entitled Drunk Uncle, which was released in 2001 by We Put Out Records. Comparing it to their first album, Allmusic reviewer Robert Hicks notes that Drunk Uncle "segue[s] from crunchy power pop and twangy country rock to distorted guitar sound effects and distinctive goofball eccentricity"

Members 
Lee Estes – bass
Tom Gerke – guitar and vocals
Scott Kopitskie – drums
Marc Maurizi – guitar and vocals

Discography 

Albums
Cropduster (1998)
Drunk Uncle (2001)

Appearing on
Mint 400 Records Presents the Beach Boys Pet Sounds (2013)
Patchwork (2014)

References 

Citations

Bibliography

External links 

American alternative rock groups
Musical groups from New Jersey
Mint 400 Records artists